Igumnovo is a rural locality (a village) in Churovskoye Rural Settlement, Sheksninsky District, Vologda Oblast, Russia. The population was 31 as of 2002.

Geography 
Igumnovo is located 14 km northeast of Sheksna (the district's administrative centre) by road. Podgorny is the nearest rural locality.

References 

Rural localities in Sheksninsky District